A boat race is a sports event in which boats, or other types of watercraft, race on water.

Boat race may also refer to:

 The Boat Race, an annual rowing contest between the universities of Oxford and Cambridge
The Women's Boat Race, the same competition for women
Henley Boat Races, a series of competitions on the Thames River in London
 The Boat Race (film), a 2009 drama film starring Sergi Lopez
 Boat race (game), a drinking game